Setherial is a Swedish black metal band founded in 1993 by guitarists Alastor Mysteriis and Devothan. They play a faster style of black metal like certain popular bands Marduk and Dark Funeral. They have released 6 albums, with Ekpyrosis having been released in 2010.

Discography

Demos and EPs
A Hail to the Faceless Angels [Demo] - (1994)
För Dem Mitt Blod [EP] - (1995)

Studio releases
Nord... - (1996)
Lords of the Nightrealm - (1998)
Hell Eternal - (1999)
From The Ancient Ruins (Re-release of old material and previously unreleased tracks) - (2003)
Endtime Divine - (2003)
Death Triumphant - (2006)
Ekpyrosis - (2010)

Band members

Current
 Infaustus - vocals (2003-present)
 Kraath - guitars, bass guitar (1994-present), vocals (1994-1996, 1998)
 Alastor Mysteriis - bass guitar, drums (1998-present), guitar (1993-1998)
 Empyrion - drums, (2010-present)

Former
Vocals
 Kheeroth - (1993–1995) (Midvinter)
 Wrath - (1999–2003) (Naglfar)

Bass guitar
 Thorn - (1994–1996) (Blot Mine, Egregori)
 Sasrof - (1998–2001) (Bloodline, Diabolicum, Hyena)
 Zathanel (Anders Löfgren) - ((previously drums 1993-1995); bass 2001–2005) (Blot Mine, Blackwinds, Sorhin, Midvinter)
 Funestus Inferis (Daniel Lindgren) - (2005-2009) (Apostasy, Divine Souls)

Drums
 Moloch (Otto Wiklund) - (1996–1998) (R.I.P. October 18, 1976 - August 13, 2006, heart failure) (In Battle, Odhinn)

Guitars
 Thurz - (2007-2010) (Conquest, In Aeturnum)
 Choronzon (G. Johansson) - (1996-2006) (Torchbearer, Chaosdaemon, Slightly Satanic, Soulcinders)
 Devothan - (1993–1995)
 Guh.Lu - (2010)

Timeline

External links 
Setherial at Regain Records

Setherial at Encyclopaedia Metallum

Swedish black metal musical groups
Musical groups established in 1993
Musical quartets